Javier Loayza Barea is a Bolivian diplomat. He has served as the Permanent Representative to the United Nations (UN Ambassador) of Bolivia. He served as President of the UNICEF Executive Board at the international level in 2007.

References

Permanent Representatives of Bolivia to the United Nations
Chairmen and Presidents of UNICEF
Bolivian officials of the United Nations